William Arthur "Bill" Stowe  (March 23, 1940 – February 8, 2016) was an American rowing stroke. He won gold medals at the 1964 Olympics and 1967 Pan American Games, and a bronze medal at the 1965 European championships.

Early life
Stowe was born in Oak Park, Illinois. He graduated from Kent School in 1958 and Cornell University, class of 1962. After that he joined the U.S. Navy and was dispatched to Vietnam, where he rowed at the Club Nautique in Saigon. He returned from Vietnam as a lieutenant, and was stationed in Philadelphia, where he joined the Vesper Boat Club.

Later life 
Stowe was the crew coach of Columbia University from 1967 to 1971 when he went to the U.S. Coast Guard Academy to start the rowing program there. He was also the "color" commentator for ABC during the 1968 and 1972 Olympic Games. Stowe wrote of his eight's experience in the 1964 Summer Olympics in the book All Together (2005). In his final years, Stowe lived at the Olympic Village of Lake Placid, New York. In 2011 he received the Jack Kelly Award.

References

External links

1940 births
American male rowers
Kent School alumni
Cornell Big Red rowers
2016 deaths
Olympic gold medalists for the United States in rowing
Rowers at the 1964 Summer Olympics
Columbia Lions rowing coaches
Coast Guard Bears rowing coaches
Sportspeople from Oak Park, Illinois
Medalists at the 1964 Summer Olympics
Pan American Games gold medalists for the United States
Pan American Games medalists in rowing
Rowers at the 1967 Pan American Games
European Rowing Championships medalists
Medalists at the 1967 Pan American Games
United States Navy personnel of the Vietnam War
United States Navy officers
Military personnel from Illinois